Thomas John Butler (20 September 1875 – 8 July 1937) was an Australian politician.

He was born in Sheffield, Tasmania. In 1931 he was elected to the Tasmanian House of Assembly as a Nationalist member for Darwin. He was defeated in 1934. Butler died in Hobart in 1937.

References

1875 births
1937 deaths
Nationalist Party of Australia members of the Parliament of Tasmania
Members of the Tasmanian House of Assembly